Acediasulfone (INN) is an antimicrobial drug, which also has antimalarial activity. It is a long-acting prodrug of dapsone, which is used for treating leprosy.

Synthesis 
Dapsone is somewhat inconvenient to administer to patients because of its rather low water solubility.

In the search for more easily administered drugs, dapsone (1) was reacted with bromoacetic acid to give acediasulfone (2) which can be administered as a water-soluble salt.

References 

Benzosulfones
Abandoned drugs
Anilines